The Model 67 is a square plastic cased Austrian minimum metal anti-tank blast mine. The mines pressure fuze sits on the top of the mine, with a provision for an anti-handling device. A second version of the mine the ATM-75 is similar to the Model 67 mine.

Specifications
 Diameter: 280 mm
 Width: 283 mm
 Weight: 8.3 kg
 Explosive content: 7.4 kg of TNT

References
 Jane's Mines and Mine Clearance 2005-2006
 

Anti-tank mines
Land mines of Austria